Cer-vit is a family of glass-ceramic materials that were invented by Owens Illinois in the mid-1960s. Its principle ingredients are the oxides of lithium, aluminum and silicon. It is melted to form a glass which is then heat treated to nucleate and crystallize it into a material that is more than 90% microscopic crystals. Its formulation and heat treatment can be modified to produce a variety of material properties. One form is a material that is transparent and has a near zero thermal expansion. Its transparency is because the microscopic crystals are smaller than the wave length of light and are transparent, and its low thermal expansion is because they have a spodumene structure.

This material (Cer-Vit C 101) was used to form large mirror blanks (158 inches in diameter) that were used in telescopes in several places, including South America, France and Australia. Owens Illinois ceased production of C101 in 1978. In addition, Cer-Vit materials were used to make stove tops, cook ware and aviation applications, but never commercialized.

Today, glass-ceramic products such as transparent mirror blanks and stove tops, and cookware are manufactured and in daily use. These products include trade names of Zerodor, Hercuvit, and Pyroceram. Most of which have low or zero thermal expansion, which allows them to be exposed to rapid temperature changes or localized heating or cooling.

References

Structure and Characterization of Lithiumaluminalsilicate Glass and Glass Ceramics derived from Spodumene Mineral. A. Nordman, Y Cheng, T.J. Bastock, Journal of Physics Condensed Matter, Volume 7, Number 16

Glass-ceramics capture $2 million telescope-mirror contract. David H. Taeler, Ceramic Age, August 1968, Volume 84, Number 8

Transparent Glass-Ceramics G. H. Beal, D. A. Duke, Journal of Materials Science 4(1969) 140-152

Applications
At Mount Lemmon Observatory, two 1.5 meter diameter telescopes have a Cer-Vit glass mirror.  One of the telescopes discovered 2011 AG5, an asteroid which achieved 1 on the Torino Scale.

References

External links
Glass Types - Oldham Optical
Low thermal expansion glass ceramics - Hans Bach, Dieter Krause

Glass types
Glass-ceramics
Low-expansion glass
Glass trademarks and brands
Transparent materials